Kanyutkwin is a town in Pyu Township, Taungoo District, Pegu region in Myanmar, also known as Burma.

Etymology
Kanyutkwin: Kanyut - a breed of plant + Kwin - lake. Kanyutkwin: Lake with Kanyut plants.

References

External links
"Kanyutkwin Map — Satellite Images of Kanyutkwin" Maplandia

Populated places in Bago Region
Township capitals of Myanmar